Ust-Ayaz (Ust-Äyäź) is a rural locality (a village) in Duvansky District, Bashkortostan, Russia. The population was 227 as of 2010. There are 5 streets.

Geography 
Ust-Ayaz is located 104 km northwest of Mesyagutovo (the district's administrative centre) by road. Zaimka is the nearest rural locality.

References 

Rural localities in Duvansky District